Brett Dietz (born October 8, 1981) is American football coach and former quarterback. He is the head football coach at DePauw University in Greencastle, Indiana, a position he has held since 2020. Dietz played college football at Hanover College in Hanover, Indiana and professionally with several teams including the Turku Trojans in Finland Vaahteraliiga  and in Arena Football League (AFL), Af2, and the National Indoor Football League (NIFL) for the Cincinnati Marshals,  Louisville Fire, Tampa Bay Storm and California Redwoods.

Early life
Dietz played high school football at Covington Catholic High School in Park Hills, Kentucky. He was inducted into the school's Hall of Fame in 2020. He then attended Hanover College becoming the starter his junior and senior seasons. In 2002, he led the team to an undefeated regular season before falling to Wittenburg in the first round of the playoffs. He threw for 2,296 yards on 182 completions on 309 attempts with 26 touchdowns and 13 interceptions, also added two rushing touchdowns. He was tabbed first-team all-Heartland Conference. His senior season, Dietz again led the Panthers to a playoff birth after leading the team to a 8-3 record and another conference title. In the first round playoff loss to Baldwin-Wallace, Dietz set a Division III playoff record for completions and attempts after going 46-78 for 520 yards and 4 TDs and 4 INTs. He was once again a first team all-Heartland Conference selection and set school records for completions and attempts going 314-497 for 3,511 yards with 35 TDs and 12 INTs. 

Dietz also played basketball, baseball, and golf at Hanover.

Professional playing career
Dietz is the only player in AFL and af2 history to win "rookie of the year" in back-to-back seasons (2006 with Louisville Fire (af2), 2007 with Tampa Bay Storm (AFL)).

Turku Trojans
Dietz began his career in 2004 playing for the Turku Trojans in Finland Vaahteraliiga. 
He led the Trojans to the top-ranked pass offense, while guiding the team to the Maple Bowl championship game before losing to the Helsinki Roosters.

Cincinnati Marshals
In 2005, Dietz played with the Cincinnati Marshals of the National Indoor Football League (NIFL).

Louisville Fire
Dietz attended training camp with the Tampa Bay Storm and was assigned to the practice squad on January 27. After spending six weeks on practice squad, he was released on March 9 to join the af2's Louisville Fire. He spent the remainder of 2006 with Fire as starting quarterback and was named af2 Spalding Rookie of the Year and first-team American Conference All-af2. Set af2 single-game high with 12 touchdown passes 6/17/06 at Albany, where he completed 23 of 31 passes for 314 yards. He led af2 in completion percentage (71.2%) and pass efficiency (126.7).

Tampa Bay Storm
Dietz became starting quarterback in 2007 after both John Kaleo and Stoney Case were injured . He propelled them to an 8–1 record and led them to the playoffs after a 1–6 start, although they lost 56–55 in his first playoff game. However, for his efforts during the season, Dietz was named co-rookie of the year in the league. After the Arena Football League returned for the 2010 season, Dietz returned with the Storm. He led them to a 13–6 record, but the team was defeated in ArenaBowl XXIII by the Spokane Shock.

California Redwoods
Dietz was drafted by the California Redwoods of the United Football League in the UFL Premiere Season Draft in 2009. He signed with the team on August 18. He was released on September 23.

Statistics

Coaching career
Dietz was the quarterbacks coach for Cascade High School in Clayton, Indiana for the 2006 season. 

Dietz was announced as the head coach of DePauw on January 2, 2020. Dietz has coached at the school since 2010 as a position coach and was the offensive coordinator the previous six seasons. He coached his team to 2-0 record in his first season during the COVID-19 shortened season.

Head coaching record

References

External links
 DePauw profile
 Arena Football bio
 

1981 births
Living people
American football quarterbacks
Chicago Rush players
DePauw Tigers football coaches
Hanover Panthers football players
Kansas City Brigade players
Louisville Fire players
Marian Knights football coaches
Sacramento Mountain Lions players
Spokane Shock players
Tampa Bay Storm players
High school football coaches in Indiana
Covington Catholic High School alumni
Sportspeople from Covington, Kentucky
Coaches of American football from Kentucky
Players of American football from Kentucky
American expatriate sportspeople in Finland
American expatriate players of American football